The Turkish Seniors Open was an over-50s men's professional golf tournament on the European Seniors Tour that was played from 1996 to 2001 and again in 2007. The 2007 event was played at Gloria Golf Resort, Belek in Antalya Province with a prize fund was €325,000.

Winners

External links
Coverage on the European Senior Tour's official site (2007)
Coverage on the European Senior Tour's official site (2001)
Coverage on the European Senior Tour's official site (2000)
Coverage on the European Senior Tour's official site (1999)
Coverage on the European Senior Tour's official site (1998)

Former European Senior Tour events
Golf tournaments in Turkey
Recurring sporting events established in 1996
Recurring sporting events disestablished in 2007
Defunct sports competitions in Turkey